The miR-9 microRNA (homologous to miR-79), is a short non-coding RNA gene involved in gene regulation. The mature ~21nt miRNAs are processed from hairpin precursor sequences by the Dicer enzyme.  The dominant mature miRNA sequence is processed from the 5' arm of the mir-9 precursor, and from the 3' arm of the mir-79 precursor.  The mature products are thought to have regulatory roles through complementarity to mRNA.  In vertebrates, miR-9 is highly expressed in the brain, and is suggested to regulate neuronal differentiation.  A number of specific targets of miR-9 have been proposed, including the transcription factor REST and its partner CoREST.

Species distribution
miR-9 has been identified in Drosophila (MI0000129), mouse (MI0000720) and human (MI0000466), and the related miR-79 in C. elegans (MI0000050)  and Drosophila melanogaster (MI0000374).

Role in disease
microRNAs have been implicated in human cancer in a number of studies.  It has been shown that human miR-9 expression levels are reduced in many breast cancer samples due to hypermethylation an epigenetic modification. Hildebrandt et al. show that two genes encoding for has-miR-9 are significantly hypermethylated in clear cell renal carcinoma tumours.

References

Further reading

External links
 
 

MicroRNA
MicroRNA precursor families